John Tabatabai is a Welsh professional poker player (Lisvane, Cardiff) based in London, England. He was the runner-up to Norwegian poker player Annette Obrestad in the first World Series of Poker Europe Main Event.

Education
Tabatabai was a Law graduate of the University of Reading.

Whilst at Llanishen High School, John was briefly a member of the ska/punk band Uncle Chipps.

Early chess career 
Before embarking on a professional poker playing career, Tabatabai was a chess player.  He represented Wales in numerous international competitions as a junior.

Poker

World Series of Poker Europe 
In the final hand Annette Obrestad had a slight chip lead with 3,851,000 over Tabatabai with 3,381,000. In the small blind flat, called Obrestad's big blind, Obrestad raised the pot from 68,000 to 138,000. Tabatabai flat called the preflop raise which brought the pot to 208,000. Tabatabai re-raised an additional 750,000.

Tabatabai earned £570,150 for his second-place finish.

Other Events 
In March 2008 John Tabatabai won the 12th All Africa Poker Tournament collecting the one million Rand ($127,584) pot.

In January 2009, John won the $5,000au heads up event in Australia for $120,000au.

As of November 2010, his live tournament earnings exceed $1,360,000. His lone cash at the WSOP accounts for $912,240 of those winnings.

Notes

External links 
Official Blog
Betfair Profile
Black Belt Poker Interview

Welsh poker players
Living people
Year of birth missing (living people)